Baron Hacking, of Chorley in the County Palatine of Lancaster, is a title in the Peerage of the United Kingdom. It was created in 1945 for the Conservative politician Sir Douglas Hacking, 1st Baronet. He was Chairman of the Conservative Party from 1936 to 1942. Hacking had already been created a baronet in 1938.  the titles are held by his grandson, the third Baron, who succeeded his father in 1971.

Barons Hacking (1945)
Douglas Hewitt Hacking, 1st Baron Hacking (1884–1950)
Douglas Eric Hacking, 2nd Baron Hacking (1910–1971)
Douglas David Hacking, 3rd Baron Hacking (b. 1938)

The heir apparent is the present holder's son, Hon. Douglas Francis Hacking (b. 1968).

Notes

References
Kidd, Charles, Williamson, David (editors). Debrett's Peerage and Baronetage (1990 edition). New York: St Martin's Press, 1990,

External links
Lord David Hacking, the 3rd Baron Hacking's personal site

Baronies in the Peerage of the United Kingdom
Barons Hacking
Noble titles created in 1945
Noble titles created for UK MPs